Joseph Stan Lee (born September 26, 1961) is an American politician in the state of Kentucky. He was born in Marion County, Kentucky.

Lee, an attorney, attended the University of Kentucky where he received a Bachelor of Science and Juris Doctor.

Lee was elected to the Kentucky House of Representatives in 2000 and began his term in 2001. He represented the 45th district, as a Republican. He sat on the Judiciary, Natural Resources and the Local Government Committees. From 2006 to 2008 he was the minority whip.

Lee is married to Tami and has one daughter. He is a member of the Kentucky Bar, U.S. District Court for the Eastern and Western Districts of Kentucky, U.S. Court of Appeals for the Sixth Circuit, and the Fayette County, Kentucky, and American Bar Associations. He previously practiced law as a partner with Bowles Rice Attorneys at Law.

Awards
Defending Liberty Award from Bluegrass Institute for Public Policy Solutions (2009)
Recipient of Protector of Economic Freedom Award from Kentucky Club for Growth (2007, 2008 and 2009)
Recipient of Public Policy Award from the American Diabetes Association (2006)

References

Republican Party members of the Kentucky House of Representatives
People from Marion County, Kentucky
University of Kentucky alumni
University of Kentucky College of Law alumni
Kentucky lawyers
1961 births
Living people
21st-century American politicians